Chock or Chocks may refer to:

Devices for preventing movement 
 Wheel chock, tool to prevent accidental movement
 Chock (climbing), anchor 
 Chock, component of a sailing block

Other uses 
 Chock (surname)
 Chock (TV series), a Swedish horror television series
 Chock, a Swedish-language edition of Chill
 Chocks, a children's multivitamin product made by Miles Laboratories

See also 
 Choc (disambiguation)
 Chok (disambiguation)
 "Chocky", short story
 Chock full o'Nuts, coffee brand
 Railway wheel stop